Benny Selvianus Dollo (22 September 1950 – 1 February 2023) was an Indonesian football coach.

Dollo coached Indonesia national team in two periods, with less success compared to his predecessor or successor.

From 2004 until 2006, he trained Arema Malang in Liga Indonesia Premier Division. During his time with Arema, he has brought the club to win the First Division and Copa Dji Sam Soe (2005, 2006). Previously he has also coached Persita Tangerang to second place in the league in 2002 season.

Dollo died on 1 February 2023, at the age of 72.

Honours

Manager
Pelita Jaya Jawa Barat
 Galatama: 1988–89, 1990, 1993–94
 Piala Utama: 1992

Arema Malang
 First Division: 2004
 Copa Indonesia: 2005, 2006

Indonesia
 Indonesia Independence Cup: 2008

References

1950 births
2023 deaths
People from Manado
Minahasa people
Sportspeople from North Sulawesi
Indonesian football managers
Indonesia national football team managers
Persita Tangerang managers
Arema FC managers
Persija Jakarta managers
Mitra Kukar managers
Sriwijaya F.C. managers
Persitara Jakarta Utara managers